Princess Srinaga Svati (14 July 1855 – 7 August 1913) was a princess of Siam (later Thailand). She was a member of Siamese royal family is a daughter of King Mongkut (Rama IV) of Siam and Chao Chom Manda Tieng.

Her mother was Chao Chom Manda Tieng (daughter of Dis Rojanadis and Klai Rojanadis). She was given the full name as Phra Chao Borom Wong Ther Phra Ong Chao Srinaga Svati.

Princess Srinaga Svati died on 7 August 1913 at the age of 58.

References 

1855 births
1913 deaths
19th-century Thai women
19th-century Chakri dynasty
20th-century Thai women
20th-century Chakri dynasty
Thai female Phra Ong Chao
Children of Mongkut
People from Bangkok
Daughters of kings